Buckhart Township, Illinois may refer to the following places:

Buckhart Township, Christian County, Illinois
Buckheart Township, Fulton County, Illinois (often misspelled Buckhart Township, Fulton County, Illinois)

Illinois township disambiguation pages